Forgotten Silence is a Czech experimental metal band founded in Brno in 1993. Their earlier material can be described as death metal with some progressive/art rock leanings. Their 2006 release, Kro Ni Ka has a much more experimental sound to it, with very few traces of their earlier heavy sound. It won a Razor Award for best metal recording of the year.

Band members

Current
 Krusty – bass, vocals
 Medvěd – guitar
 Marty – keyboard
 Čepa – drums, percussion
 Petr Ševčík – vocals
 Hyenik – guitar

Former
 Skuny – vocals
 Petra – vocals
 Hana – vocals
 Prochin – guitar
 Iggy – guitar and programming
 Biggles – guitar, vocals
 Straton – drums
 Milon – drums
 Chrobis – drums
 Bana – keyboard
 Lauda – keyboard
 Siki – cello

Discography

Studio albums
 Thots (1995)
 Senyaan (1998)
 Ka Ba Ach (2000)
 Kro Ni Ka (2006)
 La Grande Bouffe (2012)
 Kras (2018)

EPs, demos, splits
 The Nameless Forever... The Last Remembrance (demo – 1994)
 Clara split with Dissolving of Prodigy (EP – 1996)
 The Hills of Senyaan pt.II split with Agony (EP – 1997)
 Hathor's Place split with Notre Dame (EP – 1999)
 Yarim Ay (EP – 2002)
 Bya Bamahe Neem (EP – 2004)
 Tumulus split with Chiasmatic (EP – 2008)

References

External links
 Forgotten Silence on Bandzone.cz

Czech death metal musical groups
Progressive metal musical groups
Musical groups established in 1993
1993 establishments in the Czech Republic